Brđani Cesta is a village in Croatia, in the municipality of Sunja, Sisak-Moslavina County. It is connected by the D224 highway.

Demographics
According to the 2011 census, the village of Brđani Cesta has 135 inhabitants. This represents 44.55% of its pre-war population according to the 1991 census. 

The 1991 census recorded that 91.42% (277/303) of the village population were ethnic Serbs, 3.30% were Yugoslavs (10/303), 1.98% were ethnic Croats (6/303) and 3.30% were of other/unknown ethnic origin (10/303).

NOTE: From 1957-1971 includes data for Blinjska Greda settlement. From 1981 census on, Blinjska Greda settlement is reported separately.

Notable natives and residents

References

Populated places in Sisak-Moslavina County
Serb communities in Croatia